Roland Lacombe (11 July 1938 – 24 November 2011) was a French cyclist. He competed in the individual road race and 100 km  team time trial at the 1960 Summer Olympics and finished in 13th and 7th place, respectively.

Lacombe won the Week-end Spadois in 1960 and the Roubaix-Cassel-Roubaix race in 1962.

References

External links
 

1938 births
2011 deaths
French male cyclists
Olympic cyclists of France
Cyclists at the 1960 Summer Olympics
Sportspeople from Eure
Cyclists from Normandy